Christiansburg Presbyterian Church is a historic Presbyterian church located at 107 W. Main Street in Christiansburg, Montgomery County, Virginia.  The church was organized in 1827. 
The building was erected in 1853 and is a four bay long, brick church building with a low hipped roof.  It features a three-stage tower consisting of a low, plain base, a square belfry with coupled Doric order corner pilasters, and a blind lantern stage. The whole is capped by an octagonal spire.  Also on the property is the contributing former Rectory, now known as the Kinnard Smith Building and used as a parish house.

It was added to the National Register of Historic Places in 1978.  It is located in the Christiansburg Downtown Historic District.

References

Presbyterian churches in Virginia
National Register of Historic Places in Montgomery County, Virginia
Houses on the National Register of Historic Places in Virginia
Greek Revival church buildings in Virginia
Churches completed in 1853
Churches in Montgomery County, Virginia
Individually listed contributing properties to historic districts on the National Register in Virginia
Houses in Montgomery County, Virginia